Hpruso  is a town in the Kayah State of eastern part of Burma. It is the principal town of Hpruso Township and is divided into 5 wards.

References

External links
Satellite map at Maplandia.com

Township capitals of Myanmar
Populated places in Kayah State